Fromer, also transliterated Frumer, is a surname of Jewish origin, derived from the Yiddish word frum, meaning "devout" or "pious" in the sense of "committed to the observance of Jewish religious law" beyond the minimum requirements. It is most prevalent in the United States and in Israel.

Notable people
Notable people with this surname include:
 Aryeh Tzvi Fromer, also spelled Aryeh Tzvi Frumer (1884–1943), Polish rabbi
 Liza Fromer (born 1970), Canadian TV host
 Marcelo Fromer (1961–2001), Brazilian guitarist
 Rebecca Fromer (1927–2012), American playwright
 Seymour Fromer (1922–2009) American museum founder

References

Jewish surnames